The Hsingyuan Power Plant or Star Buck Power Plant is a gas-fired power plant in Chang-Bin Industrial Park, Lukang Township, Changhua County, Taiwan.

History
In April 2005, Hsing-yuan Power Corporation was approved by the government to construct the Hsingyuan Power Plant with a cost of NT$10.6 billion. The permit was then issued by the Ministry of Economic Affairs. Construction of the plant started in the end of 2005 and was commissioned in March 2009. It went into full operation in June 2009.

See also 

 List of power stations in Taiwan
 Electricity sector in Taiwan

References 

2009 establishments in Taiwan
Buildings and structures in Changhua County
Energy infrastructure completed in 2009
Natural gas-fired power stations in Taiwan